The second Inter-Cities Fairs Cup took place between 1958 and 1960 and was won by Barcelona for the second consecutive time in a two-legged final against Birmingham City. Once again, a number of countries sent a representative team for one of their main cities, although London sent Chelsea instead. The Copenhagen XI was made up mostly of BK Frem players, and played in their colours.

First round

|}

First leg

Second leg

Union Saint-Gilloise won 6–2 on aggregate.

Roma won 4–2 on aggregate.

Birmingham City won 4–2 on aggregate.

Zagreb XI won 4–3 on aggregate.

Chelsea won 7–2 on aggregate.

Beograd XI won 11–4 on aggregate.

Barcelona won 7–3 on aggregate.

Internazionale won 8–1 on aggregate.

Quarter-finals

|}

First leg

Second leg

Union Saint-Gilloise won 3–1 on aggregate.

Birmingham City won 4–3 on aggregate.

Beograd XI won 4–2 on aggregate.

Barcelona won 8–2 on aggregate.

Semifinals

|}

First leg

Second leg

Birmingham City won 8–4 on aggregate

Barcelona won 4–2 on aggregate

Final

First leg

Second leg

External links
 Inter-Cities Fairs Cup results at Rec.Sport.Soccer Statistics Foundation
 Inter-Cities Fairs Cup Seasons 1958-60 – results, protocols
 website eurocups-uefa.ru Fairs' Cup Seasons 1958-60 – results, protocols
 website Football Archive 1958–60 Fairs' Cup

References

2
2
Inter-Cities Fairs Cup seasons